The Man with the Claw (Italian: L'uomo dall'artiglio) is a 1931 Italian mystery film directed by Nunzio Malasomma and starring Dria Paola, Carlo Fontana, and Elio Steiner. It was made at the Cines Studios in Rome with sets designed by the art director Daniele Crespi . The film is one of several regarded as a possible precursor to the later giallo genre. A separate German version The Paw was also produced.

Synopsis
A series of violent murders are carried out by an escaped criminal, armed with a strange claw.

Cast
 Dria Paola as La dottoressa Renata Vigo 
 Carlo Fontana as Pietro Kruger 
 Elio Steiner as Gastel 
 Vasco Creti as Il commissario 
 Carola Lotti as Gina Rappis 
 Carlo Lombardi as Carlo Lopez 
 Carlo Gualandri as Rappis 
 Gino Viotti as Alberti 
 Augusto Bandini 
 Giuseppe N. Bellini 
 Fedele Gentile 
 Lucia Parisi

References

Bibliography 
 Moliterno, Gino. A to Z of Italian Cinema. Scarecrow Press, 2009.

External links 
 

1931 films
Italian mystery films
1931 mystery films
1930s Italian-language films
Films directed by Nunzio Malasomma
Italian multilingual films
Cines Studios films
Italian black-and-white films
1931 multilingual films
1930s Italian films